Grigneuseville is a commune in the Seine-Maritime department in the Normandy region in northern France.

Geography
The A29 autoroute passes through the territory of the commune.

Population

Places of interest
 The church of St.Pierre, dating from the sixteenth century.
 The thirteenth century chapel of St.Madeleine.
 The château d'Haucourt.

See also
Communes of the Seine-Maritime department

References

Communes of Seine-Maritime